The Anniversary of the Unification of Italy  is a national day that falls annually on 17 March and celebrates the birth of Italy as a modern nation state, which took place following the proclamation of the Kingdom of Italy on 17 March  1861.

However, the complete unification of Italy took place only in the following years. In 1866 the Veneto and the province of Mantua were annexed after the Third Italian War of Independence, then in 1870 Lazio after the capture of Rome, and finally in 1918 Trentino-Alto Adige and Julian March after the First World War. In this regard, the National Unity and Armed Forces Day was also established, which is celebrated annually on 4 November, recalling the Italian victory in the First World War, a war event considered to complete the process of unification of Italy.

The anniversary of the birth of the Italian state was solemnly celebrated in 1911 (50 years), in 1961 (100 years), and in 2011 (150 years). 

With the Law of 23 November 2012, n. 222, on the subject of "Regulations on the Acquisition of Knowledge and Skills in the Field of 'Citizenship and Constitution' and on the teaching of the hymn of Mameli in schools", the establishment every 17 March of the "National Unity, Constitution, Anthem and Flag Day" was definitively approved on an annual basis. While remaining a working day, 17 March is considered a "day promoting the values ​​linked to national identity".

History

The anniversary of the unification of Italy recalls the promulgation of law no. 4671 of the Kingdom of Sardinia with which, on 17 March 1861, following the session of 14 March of the same year of the Chamber of Deputies in which the Senate of the Kingdom of Italy bill of 26 February 1861 was approved, Victor Emmanuel II of Savoy officially proclaimed the birth of the Kingdom of Italy, assuming the title of king of Italy for himself and his successors:

Borrowing from the old Latin title Pater Patriae of the Roman emperors, the Italians gave to Victor Emmanuel II the epithet of Father of the Fatherland. After his death, many initiatives were destined to raise a permanent monument that celebrated the first king of a united Italy, creator of the process of unification and liberation from foreign domination with Camillo Benso, Count of Cavour, Giuseppe Garibaldi and Giuseppe Mazzini. The result was the construction of the Victor Emmanuel II Monument in Rome, called for synecdoche Altare della Patria (English: Altar of the Fatherland).

50th anniversary

In 1911, between March and April, the 50th anniversary of the birth of the Kingdom of Italy was celebrated with a series of exhibitions in Rome, Florence and Turin. In the latter city the International Exhibition of Industry and Labor was held. In the capital, whose mayor at the time was Ernesto Nathan, the ethnographic exhibition of the regions was organized (inaugurated on April 21) and the International Review of Contemporary Art, the Victor Emmanuel II Monument, the bridge Victory Emmanuel II was inaugurated on the Janiculum, the lighthouse of the Italians of Argentina. In Florence the "Exhibition of the Italian portrait from the end of the 16th century to 1861" and the International Floriculture Exhibition was held from March to July. 

The volume "The Three Capitals: Turin-Florence-Rome" written by Edmondo De Amicis in 1898 was published in support of the celebrations for the 50th anniversary.

The Accademia dei Lincei, under the guidance of Pietro Blaserna, published the work "Cinquant'anni di storia italiana" in three volumes describing the political, economic and civil life history of Italy from 1861 to 1911.

100th anniversary

The celebrations of the centenary began in 1959 with the visit to Italy of General Charles de Gaulle, from 23 to 27 June, to celebrate the memory of the Franco Piedmontese alliance that allowed the victorious Second Italian War of Independence, which constituted the spring from which two years later national unification took place. During this visit, military magazines and demonstrations were organized on the battlefields of Magenta, Solferino and San Martino, and a visit to the Victor Emmanuel II Monument in Rome.

In 1961, on the occasion of the 100th anniversary of the unification of Italy, three exhibitions were organized in Turin: the Historical Exhibition of the unification of Italy, the Exhibition of Italian Regions and the International Labor Exhibition also known as Expo 61.

Roberto Rossellini, author of numerous historical period films, directed two films centered on the Risorgimento: the celebratory Garibaldi, in which he reconstructs the expedition of the Thousand, and the more intimate Vanina Vanini, set in the times of the Carbonari uprisings.

150th anniversary

On the occasion of the 150th anniversary on 17 March 2011, celebrations were held throughout Italy and a national holiday was proclaimed with schools, offices and suspended work activities. Moreover, in order to avoid burdens on public finance and private companies, the juridical and economic effects of the suppressed holiday of 4 November were shifted to that date, or each employee had to deduct a day of leave required by the annual vacation sum.

The celebrations for the 150th anniversary began on 5 May 2010 in Quarto dei Mille, with the participation of the President of the Italian Republic Giorgio Napolitano. The town was chosen because it was from Quarto dei Mille that the Expedition of the Thousand, headed by Giuseppe Garibaldi, began on 5 May 1860. On 11 May 2010, President Napolitano attended in Marsala a historical reenactment of the arrival of the Thousand in the city. Napolitano went later to Salemi and Calatafimi to honor, together with Ignazio La Russa, the fallen of the battle of Calatafimi, which took place on 15 May 1860.

The celebrations came alive on 17 March 2011, on the occasion of President Napolitano's visit to Turin. During the three-day visit, the 'Fare gli Italiani' exhibitions (curated by Walter Barberis and Giovanni De Luna) and 'Stazione futuro' (curated by Riccardo Luna) at the OGR Officine Grandi Riparazioni in Turin, and 'La Bella Italia' (curated by Antonio Paolucci) at the Palace of Venaria were inaugurated. Over 2,000,000 visitors attended the Turin celebrations.

With the law no. 222 of 23 November 2012 concerning the "Rules on the acquisition of knowledge and skills in the field of Citizenship and Constitution, and on the teaching of the national anthem in schools", the institution of the National Unity Day, the Constitution, the anthem, and the flag were approved:

160th anniversary

The celebration of the 160th anniversary on 17 March 2021 took place during the COVID-19 pandemic in Italy, which had resulted in the deaths of more of 100,000 Italians.

18 March has been designated the Day in Memory of the Victims of the COVID-19 pandemic by the Italian government.

National Unity Day
With the Law of 23 November 2012, n. 222, on the subject of "Regulations on the Acquisition of Knowledge and Skills in the Field of 'Citizenship and Constitution' and on the teaching of the hymn of Mameli in schools", the establishment every 17 March of the "National Unity, Constitution, Anthem and Flag Day" was definitively approved on an annual basis. While remaining a working day, 17 March is considered a "day promoting the values ​​linked to national identity".

See also

 Unification of Italy
 Proclamation of the Kingdom of Italy
 Victor Emmanuel II of Italy
 Public holidays in Italy
 Anniversary of the Liberation
 Festa della Repubblica
 National Memorial Day of the Exiles and Foibe
 National Unity and Armed Forces Day
 Tricolour Day

Citations 

Festivals in Italy
Public holidays in Italy
National days
March observances
Italian unification